Temescal Creek may refer to:

 Temescal Creek (Northern California)
 Temescal Creek, San Diego County, tributary of San Dieguito River
 Temescal Creek (Riverside County), tributary of the Santa Ana River

See also 
 Temescal Creek, stream through Temescal Canyon, Los Angeles County